The Roller Derby Hall of Fame, also known as the National Roller Derby Hall of Fame, was founded in 1952, by the editors of the Roller Derby News paper.

Johnny Rosasco and Josephine "Ma" Bogash were the first two skaters to be inducted into the Hall of Fame.  The Hall of Fame was initially displayed at Madison Square Garden, where the home offices of the sport were located.  Skaters could only be inducted after their retirement.  However, four skaters were inducted and then returned to skating: Ann Calvello, Annis Jensen, Ken Monte and Charlie O'Connell.

When the International Roller Derby League, by then run by Leo Seltzer's son, Jerry, closed in 1973, the Hall of Fame also closed.  As a result, several acclaimed skaters who had never retired were not inducted.

In the late 1990, Roller Derby fan Gary Powers built up a collection of memorabilia, principally through buying and selling on eBay, but also with donated memorabilia from former skaters.  His collection of Roller Derby memorabilia is the largest in the world.  He made contact with former skaters, including Calvello, Gerry Murray, Billy Bogash, Ivy King and Buddy Atkinson, Sr. and, by early 2004, his house was described by Time Out as an unofficial roller derby hall of fame.  In September 2004, it was opened on an official basis, with the permission and blessing of Jerry Seltzer, with Powers named as its Executive Director and Curator.  According to Reuters, the re-opened Hall of Fame "not only honors legends of the game but includes memorabilia like jerseys, tickets, and programs, preserving the history of the banked track sport".

The National Roller Derby Hall of Fame & Museum closed in New York City in 2015, relocating to Palm Springs, California.

Members
Members of the original hall of fame are:

Since re-opening in 2004, the following additional members have been inducted:

External links
Official website

References

1952 establishments in New York City
Halls of fame in New York (state)
Roller derby
Sports halls of fame